The Cypriot National Guard is a combined arms force and represents the organised air, land and sea capabilities of the Republic of Cyprus. Equipment has in the past, and usually still is, imported from other countries, since the country has only very limited heavy industrial and commercial industrial capacity due to its small population and land mass (excluding Northern Cyprus). The role of maintaining, upgrading and modifying military equipment is primarily the task of the National Guard Technical Corps, though more complex activities rely upon the availability of civil contracts. As of 2023, the Republic of Cyprus will no longer be under US Defence sanctions opening the National Guard to the sale of US defence products.

Equipment 
This list contains equipment which is in use by the Cypriot National Guard.

Infantry weapons

Armored vehicles

Artillery

Air defense

Surface defense

Aircraft

Gallery

See also 
 Military operations during the Turkish invasion of Cyprus
 Turkish invasion of Cyprus
 Armoured vehicles of the Cypriot National Guard
 Cyprus Navy
 Cyprus Air Forces

References

Equipment
Equipment
Cyprus
